Welcome Home is the fifth studio album by Rehab. With the exception of the rap-based songs "#1" and "Rideout Chick", the album consists largely of acoustic rock and "country-fried pop". It is Rehab's first album not to receive a Parental Advisory sticker.

Track listing

References

Rehab (band) albums